The Mano language, also known as Maa, Mah, and Mawe, is a significant Mande language of Liberia and Guinea.  It is spoken primarily in Nimba County in north-central Liberia and in Nzérékoré, Lola and Yomou Prefectures in Guinea.

Phonology

Vowels

Consonants

Tones 
The language has nine register and contour tones.

Sample Text

See also 
 Languages of Liberia

References 

Mande languages
Languages of Guinea
Languages of Liberia
Mano people